The 2013–14 season was Frölunda HC's 34th season Sweden's premier ice hockey league, the Swedish Hockey League (SHL; formerly named Elitserien).

Pre-season

European Trophy games log

Regular season

Summary

Standings

Games log

Playoffs
Each playoff series is a best-of-seven, meaning that four wins are required to advance to the next round.

Game log

Statistics

Skaters

Transactions

Drafted players

Frölunda HC players picked in the 2014 NHL Entry Draft on June 27–28, 2014 at the Wells Fargo Center in Philadelphia.

References

External links
Frolundaindians.com — Official team website
Hockeyligan.se — Official league website
Swehockey.se — Official statistics website

2013-14
2013–14 SHL season